Terrence Miles (born 7 May 1937) is an English former football midfielder. He played for Port Vale between 1955 and 1968, helping them to the Fourth Division title in 1958–59. He later turned out for Eastwood, before returning to Vale Park as a coach.

Playing career
Born in Stoke-on-Trent, Miles attended Carmountside Secondary Modern, and played for Milton Youth Club alongside Harry Poole. Miles joined Port Vale in June 1955, and went on to make five Second Division appearances in the 1956–57 relegation season. He played six games in the Third Division South in the 1957–58 season. He then became a first team regular, and missed only one match of the 1958–59 Fourth Division title winning season. He played 41 games in the 1959–60 season, as the "Valiants" posted a mid-table finish in the Third Division under the stewardship of Norman Low. He also scored his first goal in the Football League, in a 2–1 win over Norwich City at Vale Park on 23 January. However he was diagnosed with Tuberculosis, along with teammate Peter Ford, and spent 12 weeks in hospital recovering after the disease was fortunately caught in the early stages. He was an ever-present in the 55 game 1960–61 season, and bagged three goals against Chesterfield and in both fixtures with Notts County. He played 52 matches in the 1961–62 campaign. He retained his place under new boss Freddie Steele in the 1962–63 season, playing 41 games and claiming three goals against Reading, Bradford Park Avenue, and Bristol Rovers. However he featured just 27 times in the 1963–64 season, finding the net against Southend United and Colchester United. He posted 35 appearances in the 1964–65 season, and bagged goals against Peterborough United (2), Bristol City, Brentford, and Southend United; Vale were relegated at the end of the season, despite the introduction of new boss Jackie Mudie. Miles became the club's first ever playing substitute in the Football League in a 2–0 home win over Stockport County on 4 September 1965. He went on to play 30 games in the 1965–66 season, as Vale struggled at the foot of the Fourth Division table. He played 45 games in the 1966–67 campaign, and found the net against Exeter City, Newport County, and Stockport County. He was given a testimonial, shared with Harry Poole, in August 1967. However Miles lost his first team place under new manager Stanley Matthews, and played only 22 games in the 1967–68 season. He was then given a free transfer in May 1968, and played for semi-professional club Sandbach Ramblers, alongside former classmate and Vale teammate Harry Poole. Miles later played for Eastwood and Michelin.

Coaching career
Upon his retirement as a footballer, Miles became the coach and assistant manager of Wolstanton Park Rangers and then schoolboy coach for Port Vale. He left the club after they turned down his recommendation to sign a teenage Adrian Heath, though he remained a keen Vale fan.

Career statistics
Source:

A.  The "Other" column constitutes appearances and goals in the League Cup, Football League Trophy, Football League play-offs and Full Members Cup.

Honours
Port Vale
 Football League Fourth Division: 1958–59

References

1937 births
Living people
Footballers from Stoke-on-Trent
English footballers
Association football midfielders
Sandbach Ramblers F.C. players
Port Vale F.C. players
Eastwood Hanley F.C. players
English Football League players
Association football coaches
Port Vale F.C. non-playing staff